St Leonard's is a Church of England parish church in Middleton, Greater Manchester, England. It is recorded in the National Heritage List for England as a Grade I listed building.

Much of the present building was erected in 1412 by Thomas Langley (born in Middleton in 1363) who was Bishop of Durham and Lord Chancellor of England. He re-used the Norman doorway from an earlier structure to create the tower arch.  Also distinctive in this region is the weather-boarded top stage to the tower.

The church of St Leonard was enlarged in 1524 by Sir Richard Assheton, in celebration of the knighthood granted to him by Henry VIII of England for his part in the Battle of Flodden in 1513. The Flodden Window, in the sanctuary, is thought to be the oldest war memorial in the UK. It commemorates on it the names of the Middleton archers who fought at Flodden. The church also has one of the finest collections of monumental brasses in the north of England, including the only brass in the UK depicting an English Civil War officer in full armour, Major-General Ralph Assheton.  George Pace designed a war memorial and, in 1958, added a choir vestry and installed new lighting.

In the extension of the churchyard are the war graves of two First World War soldiers, and an airman from the Second World War.

See also

 List of churches in Greater Manchester
 Grade I listed churches in Greater Manchester
 Grade I listed buildings in Greater Manchester
 Listed buildings in Middleton, Greater Manchester
 List of works by George Pace

References

External links

Official website of the Church

Grade I listed churches in Greater Manchester
Church of England church buildings in Greater Manchester
English Gothic architecture in Greater Manchester
Buildings and structures in the Metropolitan Borough of Rochdale
Middleton, Greater Manchester
Anglican Diocese of Manchester